Hugh X de Lusignan, Hugh V of La Marche or Hugh I of Angoulême (c. 1183  – c. 5 June 1249, Angoulême) was Seigneur de Lusignan and Count of La Marche in November 1219 and was Count of Angoulême by marriage. He was the son of Hugh IX and Agathe de Preuilly.

Background
Hugh's father, Hugh IX of Lusignan, was betrothed to marry 12-year-old Isabel of Angoulême in 1200, but King John of England married her instead.  As a result, the entire de Lusignan family rebelled against the English king. Hugh IX married Agathe de Preuilly instead. 

Hugh X was born in 1183. He married Isabella, widow of King John of England, on 10 May 1220  By Hugh's marriage to Isabella, he became Count of Angoulême until her death in 1246. Together they founded the abbey of Valence.

Marriage and issue
Hugh and Isabella had:
 Hugh XI de Lusignan, seigneur of Lusignan, Count of La Marche and Count of Angoulême (1221–1250)
 Aymer de Lusignan, Bishop of Winchester c. 1250 (c. 1222 – Paris, 5 December 1260 and buried there)
 Agatha de Lusignan (c. 1223 – aft. 7 April 1269), married Guillaume II de Chauvigny, seigneur of Châteauroux (1224 – Palermo, 3 January 1271)
 Alice de Lusignan (1224 –  9 February 1256), married 1247 John de Warenne, 6th Earl of Surrey
 Guy de Lusignan (d. 1264), seigneur of Couhé, Cognac, and Archiac in 1249, killed at the Battle of Lewes.
 Geoffrey de Lusignan (d. 1274), seigneur of Jarnac, married in 1259 Jeanne de Châtellerault, Vicomtess of Châtellerault (d. 16 May 1315) and had issue:
 Eustachie de Lusignan (d. Carthage, Tunisia, 1270), married 1257 Dreux III de Mello (d. 1310)
 Guillaume de Lusignan (d. 1296); known in English as William de Valence married Joan de Munchensi or Munchensy (c. 1230after 20 September 1307), the only surviving child of Warin de Munchensi, lord of Swanscombe, and his first wife Joan Marshal, who was one of the five daughters of William Marshal, 1st Earl of Pembroke and Isabel de Clare, 4th Countess of Pembroke suo jure.
 Margaret de Lusignan (c. 1226/1228–1288), married (1st) 1240/1241 Raymond VII of Toulouse (1197–1249), married (2nd) c. 1246 Aimery IX de Thouars, Viscount of Thouars (d. 1256), and married (3rd) Geoffrey V de Chateaubriant, seigneur of Chateubriant
 Isabella of Lusignan (1224 – 14 January 1299), lady of Beauvoir-sur-Mer et de Mercillac, married (1st) Maurice IV de Craon (1224/1239 – soon before 27 May 1250/1277) (2nd) Geoffrey de Rancon, seigneur of Taillebourg.

Hugh X was succeeded by his eldest son, Hugh XI of Lusignan.

According to explanations in the manuscripts of Gaucelm Faidit's poems, this troubadour was a rival of Hugh X of Lusignan for the love of Marguerite d'Aubusson.

He was buried in Angoulême.

Notes

References

Sources

Further reading
 Douet d’Arcq, Collection de Sceaux des Archives de l’Empire 1(1) (1863): 397–398 (seal of Hugues X de Lusignan dated 1224 – Sceau équestre.  Le comte à cheval, en costume de chasse, le cor au cou et tenant à la main un petit chien posé sur la croupe du cheval.  Legend: * SIGILL' : HVGONIS : DE : LEZINIACO : COMITIS : ENGOLISME; Revers.  Écu burelé.  Le champ à arabesques.  Legend: + SIGILL' “ HVGONIS : DE : LEZINIACO : COMITIS : MARCHIE.).

1180s births
1249 deaths
Year of birth uncertain
Counts of Angoulême
Counts of La Marche
House of Lusignan
13th-century French people
Christians of the Fifth Crusade
Christians of the Sixth Crusade